A free transfer is a term used in public transportation, it refers to allowing a rider to switch from one vehicle to another without paying an additional fare. This can be done by having both vehicles stop within the same fare control area, by issuing the rider a special ticket (also called a "free transfer") or by using an electronic smartcard system programmed to allow such transfers.  

Fare collection systems